Styliceps sericatus is a species of beetle in the family Cerambycidae, the only species in the genus Styliceps.

References

Eburiini
Monotypic Cerambycidae genera